Taff's Well Association Football Club is a Welsh association football Club founded in 1946. The team are based in Taff's Well, in Cardiff, and compete in the Cymru South, the second tier of Welsh football. The team is nicknamed the Wellmen and their home is situated at the Rhiw'r Ddar Stadium in Taffs Well.

History 
Following the end of World War II, Elan Gough and Bill Newman initiated the idea of merging local clubs to improve the facilities and playing standards than experienced pre-war. This idea was warmly welcomed and Taffs Well AFC was born. The club was formed at St Marys Church Hall, Glan-y-Llyn in the summer of 1946. Two teams were formed and entered into the Cardiff and District League. The club's first ground was at the Gwaelod-y-Gareth cricket club. The team then shortly moved to a field provided by Dai Parry, a local farmer. Following the inaugural season the club joined the South Wales Amateur League. The club were champions twice and runners up 4 times between 1949 and 1956 and won the Corinthian Cup in 1954.Following a successful initial period, Bill Newman died and the Club faced a difficult time. In 1960, Don James joined the Club as Secretary. The determination of Don and many others resulted in a change of fortunes for the team both on and off the pitch, with the club winning three titles in the 1970s. Don has now been with the Club for over 60 years and his fantastic efforts were rewarded in 2014 as the main stand was renamed the “Don James Stand”.

The Club won the South Wales Amateur League First Division in 1975, 1976 and 1977 as well as South Wales Intermediate Cup in 1975 and 1977. The Club entered the Welsh League in 1977. Malcolm Frazer joined the Club the same year and his hard work was recognised in 2017 with the unveiling of a new stand brandishing his name. In 1996 Norma Samuel became the Club’s Secretary having previously been a committee member and has been another tremendous servant ever since.

Under the management of current Chairman, Lee Bridgeman, the club's most successful spell in recent times saw the Club finish Division One runners up in 2011-12 and 2012–13 and winning the Nathaniel Car Sales League Cup four times in five seasons; 2011–12, 2012–13, 2014-2015 and 2015-16. In 2018-19 Taffs Well Youth side won the Welsh League Youth Division. and in 2021/22 won the JD Cymru Premier Development League South and the Cymru Premier League National Playoff. 

The Club were members of the inaugural JD Cymru South League, which began in 2019, finishing 7th in the 2021/22 season.

Honours

 Welsh Football League Division One
Runners-up: 2011–12, 2012–13; 2014–15; 2015–16
 Welsh Football League Cup
Winners: 2011–12, 2012–13, 2014–15, 2015–16,
 South Wales Amateur League
Champions: 1952–53; 1953–54; 1954–55; 1974–75; 1975–76; 1976–77
 South Wales Amateur League
Runners-up: 1955–56; 1971–72; 1972–73; 1973–74
 South Wales FA Senior Cup
Winners: 2015–16; 2016–17
 South Wales FA Intermediate Cup
Winners: 1957–58; 1974–75; 1976–77
 Corinthian Cup
Winners: 1953–54
 Corinthian Cup
Runners-up: 1950–51; 1952–53

Staff 
 Manager : Craig Sampson
 Assistant Manager: Dan Hooper
 Coach: Nathan Cotterrall
 Coach: Geza Hajgato
 Goalkeeping Coach: James McElvenney

Players

First-team squad
As of 9 March 2023.

Colours
The predominant club colours are yellow and black. The strip typically has a yellow top, with the shorts normally black. The colours of blue, green and pink have been mainly used in the away strips.

Stadium

Taffs Well play their home games at the Rhiw'r Ddar Stadium in Taffs Well. It is currently known as the Gentles Construction Stadium due to a sponsorship deal. The 3000 capacity stadium was expanded to include two new stands between 2014 and 2017.

Club staff

References

External links

 
Football clubs in Wales
Association football clubs established in 1946
1946 establishments in Wales
Welsh Football League clubs
Cymru South clubs
South Wales Amateur League clubs